David William Pearce OBE (11 October 1941 – 8 September 2005) was Emeritus Professor at the Department of Economics at University College London (UCL).  He specialised in, and was a pioneer of, environmental economics, having published over fifty books and over 300 academic articles on the subject, including his 'Blueprint for a Green Economy' series.

Background
David Pearce was born in Harrow, London on 11 October 1941, and attended Harrow Weald county grammar school, now part of Harrow College. He graduated in Politics, Philosophy, and Economics from Lincoln College, Oxford in 1963 (1st class) and then studied economics at London School of Economics from 1963 to 1964. He  held academic posts at the Universities of Lancaster, Southampton, Leicester (from 1974-1979), and Aberdeen (Chair in political economy until 1983) before arriving at UCL as Professor of Political Economy and later in Economics in 1983, retiring in 2004.

During his career he was the chief environmental adviser to the UK Secretaries of State between 1989 and 1992—Christopher Patten and Michael Heseltine. He also provided advice to a number of major companies. He was a convening lead author of the Intergovernmental Panel on Climate Change.

He was co-director of the environmental economics research centre, CSERGE (Centre for Social and Economic Research on the Global Environment), from 1991 to 2001.  Pearce also established the internationally renowned MSc in Environmental and Resource Economics at UCL.  He was an inspirational teacher held in the highest esteem by the many graduates of this degree, most of whom are now working in environmental policy making and research throughout the world.

Pearce married Sue in 1966 and had two sons, Daniel and Corin. He lived latterly in Saffron Walden, Essex.

Scholarship
Pearce is best known for setting out economic valuation techniques for natural phenomena, arguing that the environment is "under-priced" and that environmental services may be calculated. If they are, their true worth is more likely to be recognised.  His early work was on cost-benefit analysis and the economics of pollution and natural resource depletion, before these ideas entered the mainstream of the economic sciences and policymaking. Blueprint for Green Economy was published in 1989 (with Anil Markandya and Ed Barbier), and was a bestselling work with strong influence on governments in Britain and beyond. It advocated basing policy on the criterion of "sustainability", valuing environmental effects, and making use of market incentives. Market-based policies such as pollution taxes, tradable permits and conservation payments have some of their origins in Pearce's work—for example, Britain's landfill tax, the EU's emissions trading scheme and the various mechanisms for international pollution offsets in the Kyoto Protocol.

For Pearce, sustainability involved each generation passing on at least as much capital as it inherited. Environmental capital describes the stock and the state of natural resources. Economic damage was inevitable but could be controlled through realistic valuation in the market; the price of precious resources, or penalties for damaging them, should be set high (e.g. for noise, waste, global warming, risks to life and health, species conservation and biodiversity). Without this, future generations would suffer.

His love for nature and his care for the environment resonate through his work. At the same time, he was fiercely critical of environmental alarmism and sloppy environmental policy.. The "valuation" of natural phenomena was widely debated and challenged, sometimes by critics who saw Pearce as a supporter of market-based, neoliberal economic policy.

Pearce was commissioned by the Construction Research and Innovation Strategy Panel to write a report about the construction industry  and after his death, a special issue of the journal Building Research & Information was dedicated to his memory in 2006.

Honours
Global 500 Roll of Honour for Services to the World Environment by the United Nations Environment Programme (1989)
OBE (Officer, Order of the British Empire) (2000) 
'Lifetime Achievement Award', European Association of Environmental and Resource Economists (EAERE) (2004)for  contributions to the development of environmental economics in Europe. 
EAERE inaugurated a series of lectures in his honour with the objective of giving a prominent space within our conferences to the presentation of high quality work on the application of environmental economics to real policy making (2009).

Death
David Pearce died of leukaemia in September 2005, at the age of 63, only hours after being diagnosed.

References
PEARCE, Prof. David William, Who Was Who, A & C Black, 1920–2015; online edn, Oxford University Press, 2014

External links
The Guardian obituary

University College London obituary

EAERE citation - David's 'Lifetime Achievement Award' from the European Association of Environmental and Resource Economists
IDEAS/RePEc
Google Scholar

English economists
Environmental economists
Energy economists
Academics of University College London
Academics of Lancaster University
Officers of the Order of the British Empire
Intergovernmental Panel on Climate Change lead authors
1941 births
2005 deaths
Deaths from leukemia
Deaths from cancer in England
People from the London Borough of Harrow
Alumni of Lincoln College, Oxford
Alumni of the London School of Economics